is a Japanese former cyclist. He competed in the men's points race event at the 1996 Summer Olympics. He is currently the manager of the UCI Continental team .

References

External links

1963 births
Living people
Japanese male cyclists
Olympic cyclists of Japan
Cyclists at the 1996 Summer Olympics
People from Osaka Prefecture